Lambula flavobrunnea is a moth of the family Erebidae. It was described by Walter Rothschild in 1912. It is found in Papua, Indonesia, where it is distributed in the Central Mountain Range.

References

Lithosiina
Moths described in 1912